National Party – Greeks, formerly Greeks for the Fatherland, is a Greek far-right political party founded on 4 June 2020, by Ilias Kasidiaris, a former MP and spokesperson of Golden Dawn, who is currently serving a 13-year prison term for his involvement in the criminal organisation run by Golden Dawn, allegations for which he maintains his innocence.

History

After Golden Dawn's failure to secure seats in the 2019 Greek legislative election, prominent members of the party stepped down from their positions and distanced themselves from leader Nikolaos Michaloliakos. Noticeably, Giannis Lagos MEP announced his departure from Golden Dawn, along with Giorgos Germenis, Nikos Kouzilos and Panagiotis Iliopoulos to start a new party called National Popular Consciousness. All of them were later sentenced to lengthy prison terms as a result of their involvement in running a criminal organisation.

Similarly, on 21 May 2020 and after much speculation, Ilias Kasidiaris a MP of Golden Dawn for eight consecutive years, from 2012 to 2019, announced his resignation via YouTube, and the creation of a new party led by himself, under the name Greeks for the Fatherland. However, he was arrested in October 2020 right after the announcement of his conviction. 

In May 2021, the Greek Parliament voted to impose partial bans on all convicted members of Golden Dawn, including Ilias Kasidiaris, which stripped them of some political rights. 

As of 2022, Kasidiaris remains in prison and maintains his right to be elected as party member, but is not allowed to stand for leader of a party. Former Golden Dawn MP Konstantinos Barbarousis, who is also serving his prison sentence, and former Golden Dawn MEP Lampros Fountoulis have joined the party. 
Ioannis Malandris, former general secretary and many other former members of the "Patriotic Radical Union" party joined Kasidiaris party in 2022.

In December 2022, the joint descent to the 2023 elections with the National Front and LEPEN was announced.

Ideology 
In its official website, the party states it aims at reverting the demographic decline, develop the Greek national economy and that it favors anti-immigration.

The party has not openly embraced neo-Nazism and Kasidiaris' statement in 2020 rejected Nazism. However, being an offspring of Golden Dawn, the party appears to share similar views with its core ideology, mainly in terms of anti-migration, Islamophobia and rejection of globalization. As a consequence, its political ideology is being questioned in relation to the past events and recent split from Golden Dawn  and some academics, Greek and International media have described Greeks for the Fatherland as extremist and far-right. The party is person-centric with Ilias Kasidiaris being the leading voice.

A member of Greeks of the Fatherland is associated with the fringe antivax group Thematofylakes tou Syntagmatos (Greek: Θεματοφύλακες του Συντάγματος). He was among a group of Thematofylakes tou Syntagmatos members that were arrested for insurrection, violence against public workers, and the kidnapping of a school headmaster in Pieria. Some youth neo-Nazi groups in Central Greece have also been linked to Greeks for the Fatherland in late 2021 after their involvement in violent student protests.

Ban
In January 2023, efforts began by the Greek Government to ban Kasidiaris' party from running in the 2023 elections. On February 8 2023, an amendment was nominated by the Plenary of the Hellenic Parliament, which puts a brake on the descent of Ilias Kasidiaris in the 2023 elections, but also on other political figures whose leaders have been convicted of criminal acts.

References

Banned far-right parties
Nationalist parties in Greece
2020 establishments in Greece
Eastern Orthodox political parties
Political parties established in 2020
Far-right political parties in Greece
Anti-immigration politics in Europe
Conservative parties in Greece
National conservative parties
Neo-fascist parties
Eastern Orthodoxy and far-right politics
Eurosceptic parties in Greece